The 2018 Bendigo Women's International was a professional tennis tournament played on outdoor hard courts. It was the twelfth edition of the tournament and was part of the 2018 ITF Women's Circuit. It took place in Bendigo, Australia, on 22–28 October 2018.

Singles main draw entrants

Seeds 

 1 Rankings as of 15 October 2018.

Other entrants 
The following players received a wildcard into the singles main draw:
  Samantha Harris
  Sara Tomic

The following players received entry from the qualifying draw:
  Jodie Anna Burrage
  Verena Meliss
  Marine Partaud
  Astra Sharma

Champions

Singles

 Priscilla Hon def.  Ellen Perez, 6–4, 4–6, 7–5

Doubles

 Ellen Perez /  Arina Rodionova def.  Eri Hozumi /  Risa Ozaki, 7–5, 6–1

External links 
 2018 Bendigo Women's International at ITFtennis.com
 Official website

2018 ITF Women's Circuit
2018 in Australian tennis
Bendigo Women's International
2018 in Australian women's sport